Sir Robert Lyndley Sparkes (31 May 19296 August 2006) was President of the Queensland National Party from 1970 to 1990 and the mayor of the Shire of Wambo for over 30 years.

Sparkes was born in Dalby, Queensland, the son of Sir Jim Sparkes.

Most of his term was served during the period of the Bjelke-Petersen-led National Party state government.

He was knighted in the 1979 New Year's Honours for services to local government.

References

1929 births
2006 deaths
Australian Knights Bachelor
Australian politicians awarded knighthoods
20th-century Australian politicians